Miguel Isaías Jacquet Duarte (born 20 May 1995) is a Paraguayan professional footballer who plays as a centre-back for Club Nacional de Football.

Career
Jacquet began his footballing career in his homeland with Nacional. He appeared for his professional debut in April 2014, featuring for the full duration of a four-goal victory away to Guaraní in the Paraguayan Primera División. Fifty-four appearances came in his first three seasons in the top-flight. In the 2017 campaign, Jacquet played forty times across the Primera División and the Copa Sudamericana; netting four goals in the process, including against Guaraní in the league and versus Estudiantes on the continent. During his time with Nacional, Jacquet was linked with moves away to Universidad de Concepción, Gimnasia y Esgrima and KV Mechelen. 

On 29 July 2019, after one hundred and forty-two matches for Nacional, Jacquet departed to Argentine Primera División side Godoy Cruz. He left the club again at the end of the year, and joined Uruguayan club Club Nacional de Football in late January 2020.

Career statistics
.

References

External links

1995 births
Living people
Sportspeople from Asunción
Paraguayan footballers
Association football defenders
Paraguayan expatriate footballers
Paraguayan Primera División players
Argentine Primera División players
Uruguayan Primera División players
Club Nacional footballers
Godoy Cruz Antonio Tomba footballers
Club Nacional de Football players
Expatriate footballers in Argentina
Expatriate footballers in Uruguay
Paraguayan expatriate sportspeople in Argentina
Paraguayan expatriate sportspeople in Uruguay